Mullipuram Grama Niladhari Division is a Grama Niladhari Division of the Puttalam Divisional Secretariat  of Puttalam District  of North Western Province, Sri Lanka .  It has Grama Niladhari Division Code 617A.

Seguwantivu and Vidatamunai Wind Farms  are located within, nearby or associated with Mullipuram.

Mullipuram is a surrounded by the Manalthivu, Marikkar Street and Pudukudirippuwa  Grama Niladhari Divisions.

Demographics

Ethnicity 

The Mullipuram Grama Niladhari Division has a Moor majority (96.7%) . In comparison, the Puttalam Divisional Secretariat (which contains the Mullipuram Grama Niladhari Division) has a Moor majority (63.3%) and a significant Sinhalese population (26.6%)

Religion 

The Mullipuram Grama Niladhari Division has a Muslim majority (96.7%) . In comparison, the Puttalam Divisional Secretariat (which contains the Mullipuram Grama Niladhari Division) has a Muslim majority (64.2%), a significant Buddhist population (18.2%) and a significant Roman Catholic population (10.1%)

Gallery

References 

Grama Niladhari Divisions of Puttalam Divisional Secretariat